Aldona may refer to:
 Aldona, a feminine given name
 Aldona, a village in India
 I Lituani, an opera by Amilcare Ponchielli later performed as Aldona
 Aldona (fungus), a genus of fungi in the family Parmulariaceae